Calliotropis scalaris is a species of sea snail, a marine gastropod mollusk in the family Eucyclidae.

Description

Distribution
This marine species occurs off Taiwan and off Tanimbar Island, Indonesia.

References

 Vilvens, C., 2007. - New species and new records of Calliotropis (Gastropoda: Chilodontidae: Calliotropinae) from Indo-Pacific. Novapex 8 (HS 5): 1-72

External links

scalaris
Gastropods described in 2001